Yuri Kvashnin (born 24 November 1964) is a Russian former pair skater who competed for the Soviet Union. With Marina Avstriyskaya, he won gold at the 1982 and 1983 World Junior Championships and competed at the 1984 Winter Olympics, placing ninth.

Results
Pairs with Avstriskaya:

References

Navigation

Russian male pair skaters
Soviet male pair skaters
Olympic figure skaters of the Soviet Union
Figure skaters at the 1984 Winter Olympics
Living people
1964 births
Figure skaters from Moscow
World Junior Figure Skating Championships medalists